The shrine of Darb-e Imam, located in the Dardasht quarter of Isfahan, Iran, is a funerary complex, with a cemetery, shrine structures, and courtyards belonging to different construction periods and styles. The first structures were built by Jalal al-Din Safarshah, during the Qara Qoyunlu reign in 1453.

The girih tiles 

Peter Lu and Paul Steinhardt have studied Islamic tiling patterns, called girih tiles. They strongly resemble Penrose tilings, to which the designs on the Darb-e Imam shrine are almost identical.

See also
Azulejo

References

External links 

 Islamic tiles reveal sophisticated maths
 Image of tiles

Ziyarat
Islamic architecture
Tessellation